Difford & Tilbrook is the only studio album released by Difford & Tilbrook. Chris Difford and Glenn Tilbrook were the main songwriters in the new wave band Squeeze until their 1982 breakup. The duo continued to write songs together, and in 1984 released this self-titled effort.

Because Chris Difford and Glenn Tilbrook have always been the songwriters and only constant members of Squeeze, Difford & Tilbrook is often considered to be a Squeeze album in all but name. Several remastered tracks from this album have been included on Squeeze compilations such as Piccadilly Collection and Excess Moderation (both released in 1996), and tracks "Hope Fell Down" and "Love's Crashing Waves" have regularly been included in Squeeze setlists since 2010. Tony Visconti produced the album, but A&M rejected his mix, and brought in Eric Thorngren to do a new mix.

Track listing
All songs written by Difford and Tilbrook.
Side one
 "Action Speaks Faster" – 4:50
 "Love's Crashing Waves" – 3:08
 "Picking Up the Pieces" – 3:18
 "On My Mind Tonight" – 4:08
 "Man for All Seasons" – 2:35

Side two
 "Hope Fell Down" – 4:22
 "Wagon Train" – 3:36
 "You Can't Hurt the Girl" – 3:01
 "Tears for Attention" – 4:50 (Produced by Eric "ET" Thorngren, Chris Difford and Glenn Tilbrook)
 "The Apple Tree" – 4:24

Personnel
Chris Difford – guitar, backing vocals
Glenn Tilbrook – guitar, keyboards, lead & backing vocals
Keith Wilkinson – bass
Debbie Bishop – backing vocals
Andy Duncan – drums, percussion
Guy Fletcher – keyboards, backing vocals
Larry Tollfree – percussion

References

External links
 Album summary

1984 debut albums
Difford & Tilbrook albums
Albums produced by Tony Visconti
A&M Records albums